The Real Complete Columbia Years V-Discs is a 2003 compilation album by the American singer Frank Sinatra.

The 3-CD compilation includes four transcription discs pressed for Armed Forces Radio Service but not released on The Columbia Years 1943-1952: The V-Discs. The first album is also included in this collection.

Track listing

Personnel
 Frank Sinatra - Vocals
 Axel Stordahl - Conductor
 Tommy Dorsey - Conductor

See also
 V-Disc Recordings, Jo Stafford

References

2003 compilation albums
Frank Sinatra compilation albums
American Forces Network